Târgu Jiu is the capital of Gorj County in the Oltenia region of Romania. It is situated on the Southern Sub-Carpathians, on the banks of the river Jiu. Eight localities are administered by the city: Bârsești, Drăgoieni, Iezureni, Polata, Preajba Mare, Romanești, Slobozia and Ursați.

The city is noted for the Sculptural Ensemble of Constantin Brâncuși.

History

The city takes its name from the river Jiu, which runs through it. In antiquity, there was a Dacian village  in around the location of today's city surrounded by forests. After the Roman conquests of Oltenia (101-102), military units were stationed around the roads that connected different important routes at the time. During the digging of the Târgu Jiu - Rovinari railroad, mosaics, coins, ceramics and Roman bricks were found in the south-eastern part of the city. This and ancient testimonies support the idea that Târgu Jiu was a commercial town (a vicus) while under the Roman Empire's rule. A very important route that connects the Danube to Transylvania runs through the city, so historians believe that part of the Roman army under Trajan's leadership stayed and then passed in the actual location of the city.

After the 271 withdrawal of the Roman army, the city remained in the Latin influence zone, mainly because of Constantine The Great's involvement in Oltenia which he sought to bring under imperial rule. The importance of keeping this zone under Rome's control was underlined by Constantine's decision to build a second bridge over the Danube between today's Corabia (then Sucidava) and the Bulgarian city of Gigen. It was over 2400 meters long, one of the longest of all time.

This territory was under Litovoi's rule, a Vlach (Romanian) voivode in the 13th century, whose territory comprised northern Oltenia. He is mentioned for the first time in a diploma issued by king Béla IV of Hungary (1235–1270) on 2 July 1247. In 1277 (or between 1277 and 1280), Litovoi was at war with the Hungarians over lands King Ladislaus IV of Hungary (1272–1290) claimed for the crown, but for which Litovoi refused to pay tribute. Litovoi was killed in battle.

The first written account of the city appears in a document dating from 23 November 1406 in an order signed by Mircea cel Batran. Since 1497, the city has been the seat of Gorj County.

Constantin Brâncuși, who had lived here as a boy, was commissioned to contribute to a memorial monument to the fighters of World War I, called Calea Eroilor, "Heroes' Street", which was finished in 1938. His large sculptures are now the main tourist attractions in Târgu Jiu: The Table of Silence, Stool Alley, The Gate of the Kiss, and The Endless Column. The latter is shown in the middle section of the city's coat of arms.

In the 1950s the Communist mayor planned to demolish Brâncuși's "bourgeois" art. The plan was not carried out.

Starting in the 1960s, coal surface mining contributed to a rapid population growth. Other local industries include wood, machine building, textiles, glassware and construction materials (cement, bricks and tiles).

In 1992, a university was founded and named after Brâncuși.

Brâncuși ensemble
Mihai Radu, a Romanian architect based in New York, described Târgu Jiu's downtown - rebuilt during the Communist era - as little more than "a mix of poorly maintained paving, disheveled mass housing, jumbled signage and buildings of every size and description". The overall cityscape is "mundane, but vibrant and no doubt livable", with "often dissonant" street pattern and urban fabric. Representing the interior space of Brâncuși's ensemble, the Calea Eroilor - otherwise an unprepossessing, uninspiring and "unacceptably vernacular" street - defines through his sculptures the town's civic areas in the same manner as the Great Axis of Paris.

Brâncuși's work in Târgu Jiu is “absolutely revolutionary”: the sculptures exist at the same time as conventional public art with multiple meanings and as functional structures (seats, gateway, monumental marker). Most importantly for Târgu Jiu's urban design, they shape a larger urban structure, being spatially integrated with the town's urbanism in a dramatic and fundamental way. One's progression through the entire ensemble is a spatial experience rare in any modern day city. The sculptures peacefully coexist with and transcend their mundane context. Through Brâncuși's work, East and West come together in Târgu Jiu in a “completely unique” way. The town's imperfections reinforce his ensemble's place in the "messy" cityscape and its history. Juxtaposed against the city's messy urbanism, Brâncuși's ensemble is pluralist urbanism in its finest form. Civic in every way, his ensemble is closely integrated with Târgu Jiu's everyday life. A small-town Romanian fabric merged with a sculptural ensemble of world significance makes Târgu Jiu's plural urbanism astonishing.

Coat of arms
The coat of arms of Târgu Jiu consists of a shield with seven towers. In the centre of the shield lies the representation of Constantin Brâncuși's Endless Column, a symbol of Romanian art and culture. In the right and left sides of the shield lies a golden lion holding a black sword, "guarding" the column. The lion is the ancient symbol of Oltenia, thought to originate in the logo of one of Rome's legion stations in this area, the 13th Legion "Gemina (Legio XIII Gemina)". It represents the bravery and combative spirit of the city's inhabitants.

Population
1889: 4,076
1900: 6,634
1940: 26,634
2002: 96,641
2011: 80,548
As of 2011 census, 78,553 inhabitants live within the city limits: 96,29% were Romanians (75,640 people), 3,41% Gypsies or Roma people  (2.683 people) and 0,20% others.

Transport
The public transport system of Târgu Jiu consists of 2 trolleybus lines and 8 bus lines. It is operated by S.C. Transloc. S.A. A ticket for one trip costs around €0.50.
The main railway station is situated on Republicii Blvd. It was reconstructed within the last 25 years.
The city's road network consists of five boulevards (Blvd. Constantin Brâncuși, Blvd. Nicolae Titulescu, Blvd. Republicii, Blvd. Ecaterina Teodoroiu, Blvd. Unirii). The main street of the city is Calea Victoriei (Victory Avenue). The largest boulevard in Târgu Jiu is Blvd. Ecaterina Teodoroiu.
 Târgu Jiu is crossed by many important roads, such as E 79 and DN 67.

Gallery

Education
Main high schools are:
National College "Ecaterina Teodoroiu"
Tudor Vladimirescu National College
Constantin Brăiloiu Music and Arts High School 
National College "Spiru Haret"
Colegiul Comercial "Virgil Madgearu"
Colegiul Tehnic "General Gheorghe Magheru"
Scholar Group Energetic Nr. 1"

The universities are:
Constantin Brâncuși University
Spiru Haret University

Sports
The main football team of the city is Pandurii. They have spent 12 season in the country's top league, Liga I. Their best result was achieved in the 2012–13 season, when they came in second. Pandurii has qualified for European competitions on two occasions, and reached the group stages of the 2013–14 UEFA Europa League.

Also, the city has one basketball team in Liga Națională, CSM Târgu Jiu and two handball team in Divizia A, UCB Târgu Jiu, at male's and CSM Târgu Jiu, at female's.

Twin cities
Târgu Jiu is twinned with the following cities:

 Forbach, France
 Lauchhammer, Germany
 Noci, Italy
 Pendik, Turkey
 Yambol, Bulgaria

Natives
 Ioan Bengliu, general
 Ioan Culcer, general 
 Adrian Ioana, mathematician 
 Grigore Iunian, politician 
 Mihail Lascăr, general 
 Horațiu Mălăele, actor
 Vasile Martinoiu, opera singer
 Sergiu Nicolaescu, actor and film director 
 Constantin Petrovicescu, soldier and politician
 Gheorghe Tătărescu, lawyer and prime minister
 Ecaterina Teodoroiu, World War I heroine
 Emil Ungureanu, chess International Master

See also
Lake Ceauru (project)

References

External links

 
Cities in Romania
Capitals of Romanian counties
Populated places in Gorj County
Localities in Oltenia
Market towns in Wallachia